Pseudotropheus flavus is a species of cichlid endemic to Lake Malawi where it is only known from Chinyankwazi Island. This species can reach a length of  SL. It can also be found in the aquarium trade.

References

External links 
 Photograph

flavus
flavus
Fish described in 1988
Taxonomy articles created by Polbot
Taxobox binomials not recognized by IUCN